Mimectatina meridiana is a species of longhorn beetles of the subfamily Lamiinae, and the only species in the genus Mimectatina. It was described by Matsushita in 1933.

References

Acanthocinini
Beetles described in 1933
Monotypic beetle genera